Bernard Vernier-Palliez (2 March 1918 – 12 December 1999) was a French businessman, diplomat, and French Ambassador to the United States, from 1982 to 1984.

He was chairman and Chief Executive Officer of Renault Automobiles, from 1975 to 1981.

References

External links
"WORKING PROFILE: AMBASSADOR BERNARD VERNIER-PALLIEZ OF FRANCE; TRAVELING THE PATH OF DE TOQUEVILLE", CLYDE H. FARNSWORTH, The New York Times, March 24, 1983 
"Vernier Palliez à l'Elysée", ina.fr
Home | News, Entertainment, World Events Video

1918 births
1999 deaths
20th-century French businesspeople
HEC Paris alumni
Sciences Po alumni
Ambassadors of France to the United States
Renault people